Angelo is an Italian masculine given name and surname meaning "angel", or "messenger".

People

People with the given name
Angelo Accattino (born 1966), Italian prelate of the Catholic Church
Angelo Acciaioli (bishop) (1298–1357), Italian Roman Catholic bishop from Florence
Angelo Achini or Angiolo Achini (1850–1930), Italian painter
Angelo Agostini (1843–1910), illustrator, journalist and founder of several publications, and although born in Italy, is considered the first Brazilian cartoonist
Angelo Aimo (born 1964), Italian footballer
Angelo Albanesi (late 1765–1784), Italian engraver
Angelo Alistar (born 1975), Romanian footballer
Angelo Ambrogini Poliziano (1454–1494), Florentine classical scholar and poet
Angelo Andres (1851–1934), Italian zoologist
Angelo Anelli (1761–1820), Italian
Angelo Angeli (1864–1931), Italian chemist
Angelo Anquilletti (1943–2015), Italian football defender
Angelo Antonino Pipitone (born 1943), member of the Sicilian Mafia
Angelo Arciglione (born 1982), Italian pianist
Angelo Argea (1929–2005)
Angelo Avramakis, Greek musician and bouzouki player
Angelo Baccalario (1852–?), Italian painter
Angelo Bacchetta (1841–1920), Italian painter
Angelo Badà (1876–1941), Italian operatic tenor
Angelo Badalamenti (1937–2022), American composer
Angelo Badini (1894–1921), Italian Argentine footballer
Angelo Bagnasco (born 1943), Italian Cardinal of the Catholic Church
Angelo Baroni (1553–1612)
Angelo Barovier (died 1480), Italian glass artist
Angelo Barretto (born 1969), Filipino race car driver
Angelo Barrile (born 1976), Swiss politician
Angelo Battelli (1862–1916), Italian scientist
Angelo Beccaria (1820–1897), Italian landscape painter
Angelo Bendinelli (1876–1942), Italian tenor
Angelo Beolco (1502–1542)
Angelo Bergamonti (1939–1971), Italian Grand Prix motorcycle road racer
Angelo Bertelli (1921–1999), American football quarterback
Angelo Binaschi (1889–1973), Italian footballer
Angelo Bissessarsingh (1982–2017), historian and author
Angelo Bonelli (born 1962), Italian politician
Angelo Bonomelli (born 1991), Italian-Costa Rican surfer
Angelo Boucheron (died 1859), Italian painter and engraver
Angelo Branduardi (born 1950), Italian musician-composer
Angelo Brignole (1924–2006), Italian racing cyclist
Angelo Bronzino (1503–1572), Italian Mannerist painter
Angelo Brovelli (1910–1995), American footballer
Angelo Bruno (1910–1980), American mobster
Angelo Buccarello (born 1942), member of the Roman Catholic clergy
Angelo Buizza (1885–?), Italian politician
Angelo Buono Jr. (1934–2002), American serial killer
Angelo Calogerà (1696–1766), Italian Benedictine monk and writer
Angelo Caloia, President of the Vatican Bank
Angelo Caloiaro (born 1989), American-Italian professional basketballer
Angelo Cameroni (1891–1961), Italian professional footballer
Angelo Campanella (1748–1815), Italian painter and engraver
Angelo Canini (Angelus Canisius, 1521–1527), (1521–1557), Italian grammarian, linguist and scholar
Angelo Carasale (died 1742), Italian architect, active mainly in Naples
Angelo Carletti di Chivasso (1411–1495), Italian Franciscan theologian
Angelo Caroselli (1585–1653), Italian painter of the Baroque period
Angelo Carossino (1929–2020), Italian politician
Angelo Cataldi (born 1951), American sportcaster based in Philadelphia
Angelo Celli (1857–1914), Italian physician and zoologist who studied malaria
Angelo Cerica (1885–1961), Italian general and senator
Angelo Cesselon (1922–1992), Italian poster painter
Angelo Codevilla (1943–2021), Italian-U.S. professor, civil servant, and author
Angelo Colaco (born 1989), Indian footballer
Angelo Caloiaro (born 1989), American-Italian basketball player in the Israeli Basketball Premier League
Angelo Copeta (1919–1980), Italian Grand Prix motorcycle road racer
Angelo Dayu Agor, South Sudanese politician
Angelo Debarre (born 1962), Romani (Gypsy) guitarist in the manouche jazz style
Angelo Del Toro (1947–1994), New York politician
Angelo di Costanzo (1507–1591), Italian historian and poet
Angelo Dibona (1879–1956), Italian mountaineer
Angelo DiGeorge (1921–2009), Italian American physician and pediatric endocrinologist
Angelo Dolfini (born 1978), Italian figure skater
Angelo Donati (1885–1960), Jewish Italian banker and philanthropist
Angelo Donghia (1935–1985), American interior designer
Angelo Dundee (1921–2012), American boxing trainer
Angelo Emo (1731–1792), last Grand Admiral of the Republic of Venice
Angelo Ephrikian (1913–1982), Italian musicologist and violinist of Armenian descent
Angelo Everardi (1647–1680), Italian painter of the Baroque period
Angelo F. Coniglio (born 1936), Sicilian-American engineer, genealogist and author
Angelo Faticoni (1859–1931), professional freakshow artist and contortionist
Angelo Ferrari (1897–1954), Italian actor
Angelo Fierro, American film and television actor
Angelo Francesco Lavagnino (1909–1987), Italian composer
Angelo Frigerio, Italian bobsledder
Angelo Froglia (1955–1997), Italian painter
Angelo Furlan (born 1977), Italian professional road bicycle racer
Angelo Fusco (born 1956), Provisional Irish Republican Army member
Angelo Garcia (born 1976), Puerto Rican singer (ex-member of Menudo)
Angelo Genocchi (1817–1889), Italian mathematician
Angelo Genuin (born 1939), former Italian ski mountaineer and cross-country skier
Angelo Geraldini (1422–1486), Italian humanist and diplomat, who became a bishop
Angelo Gilardino (1941–2022), Italian composer, guitarist and musicologist
Angelo Giori (1586–1662), Italian Catholic Cardinal
Angelo Giuseppe Roncalli (1881–1963), Pope John XXIII
Angelo Haligiannis, managed the hedge fund Sterling Watters as a Ponzi scheme
Angelo Heilprin (1853–1907), American geologist, paleontologist, naturalist and explorer
Angelo Hesnard (1886–1969), French born psychiatrist and psychoanalyst
Angelo Infanti (1939–2010), Italian film actor
Angelo Inganni (1807–1880), Italian painter
Angelo Ingrassia (1923–2013), American jurist
Angelo Italia (1628–1700), Sicilian Jesuit and Baroque architect
Angelo Keder (born 1955), Swedish contemporary artist
Angelo Lano, American FBI agent who headed the Watergate investigation
Angelo Litrico (1927–1986), Italian fashion designer
Angelo Loukakis, Australian author
Angelo Maffucci (1847–1903), Italian pathologist
Angelo Mai (1782–1854), Italian Cardinal and philologist
Angelo Mangiarotti (1921–2012), Italian architect and industrial designer
Ângelo Marcos da Silva (born 1975), Brazilian footballer
Angelo Maria Quirini (1680–1755), Italian Cardinal of the Roman Catholic Church
Angelo Maria Rivato (1924–2011), Roman Catholic bishop of Ponta de Pedras, Brazil
Angelo Mariani (conductor) (1821–1873), Italian conductor and composer
Angelo Mascheroni (1855–1905), pianist composer, conductor and music teacher
Angelo Masci (1758–1821), Arbëresh jurist and scholar
Angelo Mathews (born 1987), Sri Lankan cricketer
Angelo Michele Bartolotti (died 1682), Italian guitarist, theorbo player and composer
Angelo Minghetti (1822–1885), Italian ceramist and painter of maiolica pieces
Angelo Monticelli (1778–1837), Italian neoclassical painter
Angelo Moore (born 1965), American musician
Angelo Moratti (1909–1981), Italian oil tycoon
Angelo Morbelli (1853–1919), Italian painter of the Divisionist style
Angelo Mosca (1937–2021), wrestler and Canadian Football Player
Angelo Mosso (1846–1910), 19th-century Italian physiologist
Angelo Motta (1890–1957), Italian entrepreneur, founder of the food company Motta
Angelo Mozilo (born 1938), CEO of Countrywide Financial until July 1, 2008
Angelo Muscat (1930–1977), Maltese-born film and television character actor
Angelo Nicolini (1505–1567), Italian Roman Catholic bishop and cardinal
Angelo Oddi, Canadian composer, songwriter, and producer
Angelo Oliviero Olivetti (1874–1931), Italian revolutionary syndicalist
Angelo Panelli (1887–1967), Italian stamp forger
Angelo Paoli (1642–1720), Italian Carmelite, known as "the father of the poor"
Angelo Paravisi (1930–2004), bishop of Crema
Angelo Parisi (born 1953), French judoka and olympic champion
Angelo Persichilli (born 1948), Italian born Canadian journalist and newspaper editor
Angelo Petraglia (born 1954), American record producer and songwriter
Angelo Piò (1690–1770), Bolognese sculptor
Angelo Pizzi (1775–1819), Italian sculptor
Angelo Pizzo, American screenwriter and film producer
Angelo Poffo (1925–2010), American professional wrestler and wrestling promoter
Angelo Puppolo, politician from Springfield, Massachusetts (Republican)
Angelo Quaglio (1829–1890), German stage designer of Italian descent
Angelo Que (born 1978), Filipino professional golfer
Angelo Quinto (1990–2020), Asian-American man killed by police
Angelo Ribossi (1822–1886), Italian painter
Angelo Rinaldi (born 1940), French writer and literary critic
Angelo Rossitto (1908–1991), American actor of Italian descent
Angelo Rotta (1872–1965), Apostolic Nuncio in Budapest
Angelo Ruffini (1864–1929), Italian histologist and embryologist
Angelo Sala (1576–1637), Italian physician and chemist
Angelo Scalzone (1931–1987), Italian sports shooter
Angelo Secchi (1818–1878), Italian astronomer
Angelo Stano (born 1953), Italian comic book artist
Angelo Starr, American singer, musician and record producer
Angelo Taylor, American athlete, Olympic gold medalist, coach, suspended by SafeSport for sexual misconduct
Angelo Thomas Acerra (1925–1990), Roman Catholic bishop
Angelo Tonini (1888–1974), Italian athlete
Angelo Torres (born 1932), American cartoonist and caricaturist
Angelo Traina (1889–1971), Biblical scholar
Angelo Trevisani (1669–1753), Italian painter
Angelo Trezzini (1827–1904), Italian painter
Angelo Tsagarakis (born 1984), French professional basketball guard
Angelo Vaccarezza (born 1965), Italian politician
Ângelo Veloso (1930–1990), Portuguese politician
Angelo Vermeulen (born 1971), Belgian visual artist and scientist
Angelo Vicardi (1937–2006), Italian gymnast
Angelo Weiss (born 1969), Italian former alpine skier
Angelo Zanelli (1879–1942), Italian sculptor
Angelo Zankl (1901–2007), O.S.B., the longest professed Benedictine monk (86 years)
Angelo Zorzi (1890–1974), Italian gymnast
Angelo Zottoli (1826–1902), Italian Catholic priest and missionary in China
Pier Angelo Basili (died 1604), Italian painter of the 16th-century Renaissance

People with the surname
Alfred Angelo, retailer of bridal gowns in Pennsylvania
Domenico Angelo (1717–1802), British fencing master and founder of the Angelo Family
Edmond Angelo (1913–1983), American theatre and film producer
Edward Angelo (1870–1948), Australian politician
Henry Angelo (1756–1835), British fencing master and memoirist. Son of Domenico Angelo
Henry Charles Angelo the Younger (1780–1852), British fencing master. Son of Henry Angelo
Ivan Ângelo (born 1936), Brazilian writer
Jeff Angelo (born 1964), Iowa politician
Jerry Angelo (born 1949), Chicago Bears general manager
Mark Angelo (born 1951), Canadian conservationist
Nancy Angelo (born 1953), organizational psychologist
Richard Angelo (born 1962), Serial killer and former nurse at the Good Samaritan Hospital in New York
Tommy Angelo (born 1958), American poker player, writer, and coach
Tony Angelo (born 1978), American drifting pioneer
Valenti Angelo (1897–1982), Italian-American printmaker, illustrator and author
Yves Angelo (born 1956), French cinematographer and film director

Fictional Characters

Given Name
 Angelo (Final Fantasy VIII), a character in the video game Final Fantasy VIII
 Angelo (Measure for Measure), a character in the William Shakespeare play Measure for Measure
 Angelo (The Comedy of Errors), a character in the William Shakespeare play The Comedy of Errors
 Angelo, a fictional character in Dragon Quest VIII
 Angelo, the titular character of the TV series Angelo Rules
 Angelo, a character on The Pretender, portrayed by Paul Dillon
 Angelo Bend, the Angle Man, a Wonder Woman's foe
 Angelo Bronte, supporting antagonist in Red Dead Redemption 2
 Angelo Buscetta, the main antagonist of The Sopranos: Road to Respect
 Anjuro "Angelo" Katagiri, a minor antagonist of Diamond Is Unbreakable
 Angelo Lagusa, the main character of the anime 91 Days
 Angelo Owens, a One-Niner lieutenant seen in The Shield, e.g., season 6 episode 4: "The New Guy"

Surname
 Tommy Angelo, protagonist of Mafia and Mafia: Definitive Edition, and a minor character in Mafia II

References

Italian masculine given names
Surnames of Italian origin